San Giacomo in Paludo is an island north of the Venice Lagoon. It is being repurposed as a cultural center after serving as a monastery, pilgrim refuge, and quarantine island in prior centuries.

References 

Islands